Kangarosa is a genus of spiders in the family Lycosidae. It was first described in 2010 by Framenau. , it contains 10 species from Australia.

Species

Kangarosa comprises the following species:
Kangarosa alboguttulata (L. Koch, 1878)
Kangarosa focarius Framenau, 2010
Kangarosa ludwigi Framenau, 2010
Kangarosa nothofagus Framenau, 2010
Kangarosa ossea Framenau, 2010
Kangarosa pandura Framenau, 2010
Kangarosa properipes (Simon, 1909)
Kangarosa tasmaniensis Framenau, 2010
Kangarosa tristicula (L. Koch, 1877)
Kangarosa yannicki Framenau, 2010

References

Lycosidae
Araneomorphae genera
Spiders of Australia